After Four was a Canadian youth television series which aired on CBC Television from 1977 to 1978.

Premise
The series was a music-oriented production geared towards teenagers. Hosts Jan Tennant and Larry Green were joined by the Christopher Ward Band.

Scheduling
The series aired on Mondays at 4:00 p.m. (Eastern) It was rebroadcast from 10 April to 26 June 1978 in the same day of week and time.

References

External links
 

CBC Television original programming
1977 Canadian television series debuts
1978 Canadian television series endings